Kamionek, is a neighbourhood in Warsaw, located on the right bank of the Vistula river. It is the birthplace of the polish statesman Roman Dmowski. Formerly a village, in the 19th century, with the beginning of the Industrial Revolution in this part of the Russian Empire, it was transformed into a textile industry center. Today it is part of Praga Południe, and most of its factories closed after the fall of the communism in Poland. It borders the Park Skaryszewski and Kamionek Lake to the south, Grochów to the east, and Praga to the north.

The 
During the November Uprising in 1831, the cemetery in Kamionek was the primary location where fallen soldiers of the Russian Army were buried.

References

External links
 Official web page of Kamionek

Neighbourhoods of Praga-Południe